The 1925 Australasian Championships was a tennis tournament that took place on outdoor Grass courts at the White City Tennis Club, Sydney, Australia from 24 January to 31 January. It was the 18th edition of the Australian Championships (now known as the Australian Open), the 4th held in Sydney, and the first Grand Slam tournament of the year. The singles titles were won by Australians James Anderson and Daphne Akhurst.

Finals

Men's singles

 James Anderson defeated  Gerald Patterson  11–9, 2–6, 6–2, 6–3

Women's singles

 Daphne Akhurst defeated  Esna Boyd 1–6, 8–6, 6–4

Men's doubles

 Pat O'Hara Wood /  Gerald Patterson defeated  James Anderson /  Fred Kalms 6–4, 9–7, 7–5

Women's doubles

 Daphne Akhurst /  Sylvia Harper defeated  Esna Boyd /  Kathleen Le Messurier 6–4, 6–3

Mixed doubles

 Daphne Akhurst /  Jim Willard defeated  Sylvia Harper /  Bob Schlesinger 6–4, 6–4

External links
 Australian Open official website

 
1925 in Australian tennis
1925
January 1925 sports events